This is a list of heads of state of Burkina Faso since the Republic of Upper Volta gained independence from France in 1960 to the present day.

A total of seven people have served as head of state of Upper Volta/Burkina Faso (not counting four Transitional Heads of State/Presidents and one Acting President in rebellion).

The current head of state of Burkina Faso is Interim President Capt. Ibrahim Traoré, who took power during a coup d'état on 30 September 2022.

Titles
 1960–1980: President of the Republic
 1980–1982: President of Military Committee of Recovery for National Progress
 1982: Chairman of Provisional Committee of Popular Salvation
 1982–1983: Head of State
 1983–1987: Chairman of National Revolutionary Council and Head of State
 1987–1991: President of Popular Front and Head of State
 1991–2014: President of the Republic
 2015: Chairman of National Council for Democracy
 2015–2022: President of the Republic
 2022-present: President of the Patriotic Movement for Safeguard and Restoration

Key
Political parties

Other factions

Status

List of officeholders

Timeline

Latest election

See also
 Politics of Burkina Faso
 List of prime ministers of Burkina Faso
 List of colonial governors of French Upper Volta

Notes

References

External links
 Presidency
 World Statesmen – Burkina Faso

Burkina Faso
 
Heads of state
Heads of state
1960 establishments in Upper Volta